The 1980 National Invitation Tournament was the 1980 edition of the annual NCAA college basketball competition.

Selected teams
Below is a list of the 32 teams selected for the tournament.

 Alabama
 Boston College
 Boston University
 Bowling Green
 Connecticut
 Duquesne
 Grambling
 Illinois
 Illinois State
 Jacksonville
 Lafayette
 Long Beach State
 Loyola (IL)
 Michigan
 Minnesota
 Mississippi
 Murray State
 Nebraska
 Penn State
 Pepperdine
 Pittsburgh
 Saint Joseph's
 Saint Peter's
 Southwestern Lafayette
 Texas
 UAB
 UTEP
 UNLV
 Virginia
 Washington
 West Texas State
 Wichita State

Brackets
Below are the four first round brackets, along with the four-team championship bracket.

Semifinals & finals

See also
 1980 NCAA Division I basketball tournament
 1980 NCAA Division II basketball tournament
 1980 NCAA Division III basketball tournament
 1980 NAIA Division I men's basketball tournament
 1980 National Women's Invitational Tournament

References

National Invitation
National Invitation Tournament
1980s in Manhattan
Basketball in New York City
College sports in New York City
Madison Square Garden
National Invitation Tournament
National Invitation Tournament
Sports competitions in New York City
Sports in Manhattan